Senior lieutenant is a military grade between a lieutenant and a captain, often used by countries from the former Eastern Bloc. It is comparable to first lieutenant.

Finland

 is a Finnish military rank above  and below . It is used in the Finnish Defence Forces (army, navy and air force) and the Finnish Border Guard.

The prescribed duty is a company vice-commander. Officers who have graduated as Bachelors of Military Science from the National Defence College with the rank of  usually re-enter the college after four years' tour of duty. After a study of two additional years, they are promoted  and return to more challenging duties.  is also the highest rank available to those educated in the now-decommissioned school  (comparable to a military junior college).

History and related ranks 
The rank of  came to Finland from Germany with Finnish Jäger troops in 1918, but Carl Gustaf Emil Mannerheim considered it too German and encouraged holders of the rank to use more the general rank of lieutenant instead.

Germany, Austria & Switzerland

Russia

Senior lieutenant is used in the army, air force or navy of Russia and the former USSR.

Russian Empire and Soviet Union 
In the Russian Empire senior lieutenant first appeared in the Table of Ranks (1909–1911) exclusively as naval rank IX class, and from 1912 as VIII class. Corresponding ranks were captain in the infantry, rotmister (derived from the German Rittmeister) in the cavalry, and yesaul in the Cossacks corps. In the civil administration it was almost equivalent to the "council assessor" (Russian коллежский асессор; kollezhsky assessor).

As result of the October Revolution this rank was abolished along with all other Russian ranks and rank insignia. It was reintroduced to the armed forces of the Soviet Union by disposal of the Central Executive Committee of the Soviet Union and the Council of People's Commissars in 1935. A senior lieutenant was junior to a captain or captain-lieutenant and senior to a lieutenant.

Russian Federation 
The Russian Federation inherited the rank structure of the armed forces of the Soviet Union.

If military personnel serve in a guards formation, or on a guards warship, the word "guards" is placed before the rank (e.g. "guards senior lieutenant"). For civilian or military personnel with a specific level of expertise or knowledge in the medical or judicial professions, the words "medical" or "legal" are placed before the rank (e.g. "legal senior lieutenant"). The word "retired" is added after the rank for retired officers. Police, internal troops and tax office personnel have their branch added after the rank (e.g. "senior lieutenant of police")

Senior lieutenant's insignia

References 

Military officer ranks
Military ranks of Finland
Military ranks of Germany
Military ranks of Russia